Cyrtodactylus soba, also known as the Dumbara bent-toed gecko or Knuckles bent-toed gecko, is a species of gecko endemic to island of Sri Lanka.

Habitat & Distribution
A bent-toed gecko found only from Knuckles Mountain Range of Sri Lanka.

Description
Head is not depressed. Snout short. Body robust. Lamellae under fourth toe are 6-7. Claws are short. Mental subpentagonal, with concave posterior lateral borders. Dorsal scales across mid-body between ventro-lateral folds, 61-72. Tubercles on para-vertebral row are 225-31. Longitudinal rows of tubercles range from 7-10. Ventral scales imbricate with pointed posterior edges. Tail is long, slender and subcylindrical. 
Dorsum grayish brown with 5 dark brown bands. A dark canthal stripe with same color found that meets on nape. Flanks with a marbled pattern is found. Forehead with dark spots.

Ecology
Found in cardamom barns and from walls of tea plantation estates buildings, and also from tree trunks in densely shaded areas and rock caves.
Feeds on insects and their larvae.

Reproduction
Lays 2 large spherical eggs of diameter 18 * 15mm within tree holes, rock crevices or spaces between bricks, in abandoned houses during June - August. Hatchlings measure 38-41mm and emerge in August and September.

References
 http://reptile-database.reptarium.cz/species?genus=Cyrtodactylus&species=soba
 http://animaldiversity.ummz.umich.edu/accounts/Cyrtodactylus_soba/classification/
 https://web.archive.org/web/20140714220720/http://www.wht.lk/storage/miscellaneous/Cyrtodactylus%20RBZ.pdf
 http://www.srisalike.com/Founa/Reptiles/Endemic/Cyrtodactylus%20soba.aspx

Cyrtodactylus
Reptiles of Sri Lanka
Lizards of Asia
Reptiles described in 2005